William Jacob Heller House is a historic home located at Easton, Northampton County, Pennsylvania. It was built about 1900, and is an eclectic, three story Spanish Colonial Revival residence with stucco coated concrete exterior walls. It features a gently sloping and widely projecting red clay tile roof. The house was built by William Jacob Heller (1857-1920), who operated the first exclusive flag manufactory in the United States.

It was added to the National Register of Historic Places in 1982.

References

Houses on the National Register of Historic Places in Pennsylvania
Spanish Colonial Revival architecture in the United States
Houses in Northampton County, Pennsylvania
Art Nouveau architecture in Pennsylvania
Art Nouveau houses
Houses completed in 1900
National Register of Historic Places in Northampton County, Pennsylvania